Jon Merrill may refer to:

Jon Merrill (fandom editor) (born 1945), American fandom editor and collector 
Jon Merrill (ice hockey) (born 1992), American professional ice hockey defenceman
Jon Merrill, American football player selected 223rd overall by the Minnesota Vikings in the 1996 NFL Draft

See also
John Merrill (disambiguation)